Sam Kwong from the City University of Hong Kong was named Fellow of the Institute of Electrical and Electronics Engineers (IEEE) in 2014 for contributions to optimization techniques in cybernetics and video coding.

References

Fellow Members of the IEEE
Living people
Year of birth missing (living people)
Academic staff of the City University of Hong Kong
Place of birth missing (living people)